Coelichneumon is a genus of wasps belonging to the family Ichneumonidae.

Genera

 Coelichneumon abnormis
 Coelichneumon afghanicus
 Coelichneumon aglaotypus
 Coelichneumon alaicus
 Coelichneumon albicillus
 Coelichneumon albicoxa
 Coelichneumon albitrochantellus
 Coelichneumon albonotatus
 Coelichneumon albopilosellus
 Coelichneumon alvarado
 Coelichneumon annulipes
 Coelichneumon anospilus
 Coelichneumon anthrax
 Coelichneumon assimilis
 Coelichneumon ater
 Coelichneumon atratorius
 Coelichneumon atrox
 Coelichneumon azotus
 Coelichneumon bacillus
 Coelichneumon barnstoni
 Coelichneumon beatus
 Coelichneumon bellatulus
 Coelichneumon biannulatus
 Coelichneumon biguttulatus
 Coelichneumon bilineatus
 Coelichneumon bimaculatus
 Coelichneumon birmanicus
 Coelichneumon bivittatus
 Coelichneumon bodmanorum
 Coelichneumon bohemani
 Coelichneumon bonthainensis
 Coelichneumon brunneri
 Coelichneumon cabrerai
 Coelichneumon caerulescens
 Coelichneumon caesareus
 Coelichneumon caroni
 Coelichneumon castaniventris
 Coelichneumon celebensis
 Coelichneumon chalybeus
 Coelichneumon chinicus
 Coelichneumon citimus
 Coelichneumon clypeatus
 Coelichneumon coactus
 Coelichneumon columbianus
 Coelichneumon comitator
 Coelichneumon consimilis
 Coelichneumon coreanus
 Coelichneumon coxalis
 Coelichneumon crassicornis
 Coelichneumon cretatus
 Coelichneumon cyaniventris
 Coelichneumon cyaniventrops
 Coelichneumon decemguttatus
 Coelichneumon decrescens
 Coelichneumon deliratorius
 Coelichneumon delirops
 Coelichneumon desinatorius
 Coelichneumon desultorius
 Coelichneumon dolichopsis
 Coelichneumon dorsosignatus
 Coelichneumon dubius
 Coelichneumon eburnifrons
 Coelichneumon erebeus
 Coelichneumon erythromerus
 Coelichneumon eversmanni
 Coelichneumon exephanopsis
 Coelichneumon eximiops
 Coelichneumon eximius
 Coelichneumon falsificus
 Coelichneumon femoralis
 Coelichneumon flagellator
 Coelichneumon flavitarsis
 Coelichneumon flavoguttatus
 Coelichneumon flavolineatus
 Coelichneumon flebilis
 Coelichneumon formicariator
 Coelichneumon formosulus
 Coelichneumon foxleei
 Coelichneumon fulvibasalis
 Coelichneumon fulvipes
 Coelichneumon funebrator
 Coelichneumon futasujii
 Coelichneumon gargawensis
 Coelichneumon geminus
 Coelichneumon godwinausteni
 Coelichneumon graecus
 Coelichneumon haemorrhoidalis
 Coelichneumon heptapotamicus
 Coelichneumon histricus
 Coelichneumon hopponis
 Coelichneumon hormaleoscelus
 Coelichneumon imperiosus
 Coelichneumon impressor
 Coelichneumon inutilis
 Coelichneumon iridipennis
 Coelichneumon jejunus
 Coelichneumon junceus
 Coelichneumon klapperichi
 Coelichneumon kosempensis
 Coelichneumon lacrymator
 Coelichneumon latimodjongis
 Coelichneumon leucocerus
 Coelichneumon leucographus
 Coelichneumon lineaticeps
 Coelichneumon lineiscutis
 Coelichneumon lisae
 Coelichneumon litoralis
 Coelichneumon lividusus
 Coelichneumon maculiscutis
 Coelichneumon madritinus
 Coelichneumon magniceps
 Coelichneumon magniscopa
 Coelichneumon mandibularis
 Coelichneumon maritimensis
 Coelichneumon masoni
 Coelichneumon maurus
 Coelichneumon mayri
 Coelichneumon mengkokae
 Coelichneumon merula
 Coelichneumon metidjensis
 Coelichneumon microstictus
 Coelichneumon moestus
 Coelichneumon mohrii
 Coelichneumon mongolicus
 Coelichneumon motivus
 Coelichneumon multimaculatus
 Coelichneumon navus
 Coelichneumon neocitimus
 Coelichneumon neocretatus
 Coelichneumon neomexicanus
 Coelichneumon neotypus
 Coelichneumon nigerrimus
 Coelichneumon nigratoricolor
 Coelichneumon nigratus
 Coelichneumon nigroindicum
 Coelichneumon nigrosignatus
 Coelichneumon nipponicus
 Coelichneumon nivosus
 Coelichneumon nobilis
 Coelichneumon nothus
 Coelichneumon nudicoxator
 Coelichneumon nudus
 Coelichneumon obscuratus
 Coelichneumon ocellus
 Coelichneumon octoguttatus
 Coelichneumon oltenensis
 Coelichneumon ophiusae
 Coelichneumon opulentus
 Coelichneumon orbitator
 Coelichneumon orpheus
 Coelichneumon penetrans
 Coelichneumon penicillatus
 Coelichneumon pepticus
 Coelichneumon percussor
 Coelichneumon pervagus
 Coelichneumon phaenomenon
 Coelichneumon piceipennis
 Coelichneumon pieli
 Coelichneumon pomilioaeneus
 Coelichneumon popae
 Coelichneumon probator
 Coelichneumon prolixus
 Coelichneumon pseudowalleyi
 Coelichneumon pulcher
 Coelichneumon pulcherior
 Coelichneumon pumilionobilis
 Coelichneumon punctifer
 Coelichneumon quadraticeps
 Coelichneumon quadriannulatus
 Coelichneumon quinquemaculatus
 Coelichneumon rasnitsyni
 Coelichneumon rubricoxa
 Coelichneumon rubroaeneus
 Coelichneumon rudis
 Coelichneumon rufibasalis
 Coelichneumon ruficauda
 Coelichneumon rufiventris
 Coelichneumon rufofemoratus
 Coelichneumon sassacoides
 Coelichneumon sassacus
 Coelichneumon scutellaris
 Coelichneumon semilaevis
 Coelichneumon septenus
 Coelichneumon serenus
 Coelichneumon sillemi
 Coelichneumon similior
 Coelichneumon singularis
 Coelichneumon sinister
 Coelichneumon strigosus
 Coelichneumon strombus
 Coelichneumon subviolaceiventris
 Coelichneumon sugiharai
 Coelichneumon sugillatorius
 Coelichneumon taihorinus
 Coelichneumon tenuitarsis
 Coelichneumon terebratus
 Coelichneumon terebrifer
 Coelichneumon tournieri
 Coelichneumon tricoloripes
 Coelichneumon validus
 Coelichneumon walleyi
 Coelichneumon vehementer
 Coelichneumon victorianus
 Coelichneumon viola
 Coelichneumon viridissimus
 Coelichneumon vitalis
 Coelichneumon yezoensis

References

Ichneumonidae genera
Ichneumoninae